Dmitri Kudinov may refer to:

 Dimitri Kudinov (born 1963), Georgian football player
 Dmitri Kudinov (footballer, born 1971), Russian football player
 Dmitri Kudinov (footballer, born 1985), Russian football player
 Dmitri Kudinov (football manager) (born 1985), Russian football manager